Rokel Commercial Bank (RCB) is a commercial bank in Sierra Leone. It is one of the commercial banks licensed by Bank of Sierra Leone, the national banking regulator.

The bank is named after the Rokel River, the longest river in Sierra Leone. RCB serves members of the public, small and medium enterprises (SMEs), as well as large corporations. According to the bank's web site, it one of the three largest commercial banks in the country by assets.

History
Founded in 1917 as Barclays Bank of Sierra Leone as a subsidiary of Barclays Bank, the name was changed when ownership of the bank's stock changed hands in 1999.

Governance
The Chairman of the seven-person Board of Directors is Birch M. Conte, one of the non-Executive directors. Victor Keith Cole serves as the Managing Director and Chief Executive Officer. He is assisted by seven other senior managers in the day-to-day running of the bank.

Branch Network
, Rokel Commercial Bank maintains a network of branches at the following locations:

 Main Branch - 25-27 Siaka Stevens Street, Freetown
 Congo Cross Branch -  1 Wilkinson Road, Freetown
 Industrial Area Branch - Wellington Industrial Area, Freetown
 Clock Tower Branch - 7 Kissy Road, Freetown
 Wilberforce Street Branch – 39 Wilberforce Street, Freetown
 Bo Branch - 10 Bojon Street, Bo
 Kenema Branch – 12 Dama Road, Kenema
 Koidu Branch - 2 New Sembehun Road, Koidu
 Makeni Branch - Independence Square, Mabanta Road, Makeni
 Moyamba Branch – Siaka Stevens Street, Moyamba
 Pujehun Branch – Stoke Road, Pujehun

See also
Banking in Sierra Leone
List of banks in Sierra Leone
List of banks in Africa

References

Banks of Sierra Leone
Companies based in Freetown